The 2017–18 FA Vase was the 44th season of the FA Vase, an annual football competition for teams playing below Step 4 of the English National League System.   The competition was played with two qualifying rounds preceding the six proper rounds, semi-finals (played over two legs) and final played at Wembley Stadium.  All first-leg ties until the semi-finals were played with extra time if drawn after regulation – first-leg ties could also be resolved with penalties if both teams agreed and notified the referee at least 45 minutes before kick-off.

Calendar
The calendar for the 2017–18 FA Vase, as announced by The Football Association.

First Round Qualifying

Second Round Qualifying

First round proper

Second round proper

Third round proper

Fourth round proper

Fifth Round Proper

Quarter-finals

Semi-finals
Semi final fixtures are due to be played on 17 March and 24 March 2018, with the second leg going to extra time and penalties if required.

First leg

Match played at Bishopton Road West, Stockton due to Marske United's ground being waterlogged.

Second leg

Stockton Town won 3–2 on aggregate

Thatcham Town won 4–2 on aggregate

Final

References

FA Vase seasons
2017–18 European domestic association football cups
2017–18 in English football